Sundaattam is a 2013 Tamil film written and directed by Brahma G. Dev. Irfan plays the hero and the newfound Arundhati as  heroine. Britto Michael has composed the music and Achu of Maalai Pozhudhin Mayakathilaey fame, the background score. Sundattam is a film based on Carrom gambling in Royapuram area in North Madras. The film, which is based on a real-life incident set in the backdrop of Chennai in the 1990s, released on 8 March 2013 to average reviews.

Cast
 Irfan as Prabhakaran
 Arundhati as Kalaivani
 Madhu as Kasi
 Aadukalam Naren as Bhagya Annachi
 Stalin as Guna
 Sendrayan as Prabhakaran's friend
 Misha Ghoshal as Uma

Soundtrack
Soundtrack was composed by Britto Michael. The album received mixed reviews with a critic citing it "has moments of melody, but only for a short term".

Reception
Sify wrote "On the whole, Sundattam is not entirely unwatchable". Moviecrow wrote "Sundattam could have been a better game, if the director had focused more on the central plot and strengthened it". The New Indian Express wrote "Unlike Striker, Sundattam just doesn’t strike the right chord". Behindwoods wrote "On the whole, Sundattam doesn’t keep you glued, but the rawness might attract few eyes."

References

External links
 

2013 films
2010s Tamil-language films
Indian gangster films
2013 directorial debut films
Films scored by Britto Michael